The Cayuga Nation of New York is a federally recognized tribe of Cayuga people, based in New York, United States. Other organized tribes with Cayuga members are the federally recognized Seneca-Cayuga Tribe of Oklahoma and the Canadian-recognized Six Nations of the Grand River First Nation in Ontario, Canada.

History 
The name Cayuga (Gayogo̱hó꞉nǫʼ ') means "People of the wet lands."

They belong to the Iroquoian language family, and were one of the original Five Nations of the League of the Iroquois, who traditionally lived in New York. The Five Nations were the Mohawk, Oneida, Onondaga, Seneca and Cayuga. When the Tuscarora joined the Iroquois Confederation in 1722, the confederacy was known as the Six Nations.

In early times, the Cayuga lived primarily between Owasco and Cayuga lakes, which lay between the territory of the Onondaga and Seneca. Jesuits founded missions among the Cayuga in the mid-17th century. In 1660, there were approximately 1,500 Cayuga.

In the beginning of the 18th century, the Cayuga primarily lived in three villages, composed of at least 30 longhouses. About 500 people lived in each of these villages. The Cayuga became trading partner with the French from Canada and were active in the beaver fur trade. They also traded with the Huron for birch bark goods.

All the main Iroquois nations except the Oneida had allied with the British in the American Revolution. They were defeated in the war. The British gave up both their and Indian claims to lands in treaty negotiations, and the Iroquois were forced to cede their lands to the United States. Most relocated to Canada after the Treaty of Canandaigua in 1794, although some bands were allowed small reservations in New York. New York made separate purchases and leases of land from the Indians, which were not ratified by the US Congress.

Government
The Cayuga Nation is headquartered in Seneca Falls, New York. They are governed by a council of chiefs, chosen by clanmothers. The Cayuga Nation is part of the Haudenosaunee confederacy.

Location
Under the 1794 Treaty of Canandaigua, 64,000 acres at the north end of Cayuga Lake were reserved.  In 2005 the Cayuga Nation began to purchase land within its claimed territory at the north end of Cayuga Lake.

Tribal enrollment
Children of tribal members can be enrolled at birth. As the tribe has a matrilineal kinship system, children are considered to be born into the mother's clan. Descent and inheritance are passed through the maternal lines. The tribe requires members to have a mother who is Cayuga.

Economic development
The nation controls several businesses, including Lakeside Trading convenience stores; Pullens Towing and Recovery service; Harford Glen Water, a pure water bottler; Gakwiyo Garden, which grows 35 types of fruits and vegetables and provides food for over one hundred member households; Cayuga Corner, which sells fresh produce and flowers; and Cayuga Sugar Shack, an ice cream stand and miniature golf course in Seneca Falls. They own Lakeside Entertainment, which includes two Class II Gaming facilities; however, both are temporarily closed due to ongoing legal battles with the State of New York.

Lakeside Trading Post 
The Cayuga Indian Nation owns two pieces of property from which it operates its Lakeside Trading Post: a convenience store and gas station operation. One store is located in the Town of Seneca Falls (Demolished on February 2020) and the other in the Village of Union Springs.

On November 25, 2008, the Seneca and Cayuga County Sheriffs' Departments seized all the cigarettes at two locations of the Lakeside Trading Post because of the Cayuga refusal to remit state excise taxes on sales. The Cayuga have said that as a sovereign nation, they do not owe taxes to the state. This was part of a long-standing issue with the counties and state. The Seneca County District Attorney said the counties were in the right because the Cayugas did not own any sovereign land in either county. The state contends that only by operating on sovereign land (a reservation) would the tribe be exempt from the taxes.

A 2005 US Supreme Court decision ruled that Indian tribes could not claim sovereignty on land they purchased; they had to apply to the Bureau of Indian Affairs and have the land put in trust for their use. The Cayuga Indian Nation sought to enjoin the authorities from initiating any prosecution and to compel them to return the seized cigarettes. New York Supreme Court Justice Kenneth Fisher denied the Cayugas' motion for a preliminary injunction and dismissed the action.

On February 22 2020 around 2am Cayuga Nation Police raided the Seneca Falls gas station and demolished it along with other buildings on the property including a school house for indigenous ceremonies, a daycare center, and some tiny homes that were being lived in at that time.

Land claims 

The Cayuga Nation of New York began a land claim action on November 19, 1980, in the United States District Court for the Northern District of New York to pursue legislative and monetary restitution for land taken from it by the State of New York during the 18th and 19th centuries. New York entered into land sales and leases with the Cayuga Nation after the signing of the Treaty of Canandaigua after the American Revolutionary War. Its failure to get approval of the United States Congress meant the transactions were illegal as it did not have the constitutional authority to deal with the tribes. A series of federal laws in the 1790s known as the "Nonintercourse Acts" required all land purchases involving native tribes to be approved by the federal government.

In 1981, the Seneca-Cayuga Tribe of Oklahoma was added as a plaintiff in the claim. A jury trial on damages was held from January 18 – February 17, 2000. The jury returned a verdict in favor of the Cayuga Indian Nation of New York and the Seneca-Cayuga Tribe of Oklahoma, finding current fair market value damages of $35 million and total fair rental value damages of $3.5 million. The jury gave the state a credit for the payments it had made to the Cayugas of about $1.6 million, leaving the total damages at approximately $36.9 million. On October 2, 2001, the court issued a decision and order which awarded a prejudgment interest award of $211 million and a total award of $247.9 million.

Both the plaintiffs and the defendants appealed this award. On June 28, 2005, the United States Court of Appeals for the Second Circuit rendered a decision that reversed the judgment of the trial court. It ruled in favor of the defendants, based on the doctrine of laches. Essentially the court ruled that the plaintiffs had taken too long to present their case, when it might have been equitably settled earlier.

The Cayuga Indian Nation of New York sought review of this decision by the Supreme Court of the United States, which was [ denied on May 15, 2006]. The time in which the Cayuga Indian Nation could ask the U.S. Supreme Court to rehear the case has passed.

See also
Green Corn Ceremony
Three Sisters (agriculture)
Wampum

Notes

References
 Pritzker, Barry M. A Native American Encyclopedia: History, Culture, and Peoples, Oxford: Oxford University Press, 2000. .

External links
Cayuga Nation of New York, official website

 
Native American tribes in New York (state)
Federally recognized tribes in the United States